"Hey Girl" was the fourth song release by popular British R&B group Small Faces. The song reached number ten on the UK Singles Charts in 1966.

Song profile
"Hey Girl" was released on 6 May 1966 with the B-side "Almost Grown". The song was written by Steve Marriott and Ronnie Lane and was a compromise between the band and their manager, Don Arden, as Arden wanted a very commercial sounding song.  A week later the group's debut album on Decca Small Faces hit the UK charts reaching number 3.

After the success of "Hey Girl" an employee of Robert Stigwood's management company contacted the band to see where they stood. When Don Arden found out, he, along with four "heavies," visited Stigwood's London offices and Arden hung Stigwood by his legs from a balcony window and threatened violence if he interfered with his bands ever again. The story would become common knowledge around the music industry, cementing Arden's tough man reputation.

Personnel
Small Faces
Steve Marriott – lead and backing vocals, electric guitar
Ronnie Lane – bass guitar, backing vocals
Ian McLagan – Hammond organ, backing vocals
Kenney Jones – drums

See also
 Small Faces discography

References

External links
The Official Small Faces Site

Small Faces songs
1966 singles
Songs written by Steve Marriott
Songs written by Ronnie Lane
Decca Records singles
1966 songs